Naeem Tahir (born 26 February  1937) is Pakistani theatre, film and television actor, scholar, public speaker, columnist, teacher and dramatist.

Career
His research work on the Pre-History of the People of Indus Valley was published by the National Council of the Arts Islamabad. His other publications include 'Views and Comments' a collection of 60 articles published in Daily Times. The volume 2 of this series is under publication and expected to be in the market in early 2014. This volume contains over 100 articles. Also in publication are his articles in English published in different magazines and Newspapers.

His publication of 'Jalsa Urdu Dramay Ka' is in Urdu. It was staged at the World Urdu Conference Islamabad and later at Alhamra, the Lahore Arts Council. Another rare form of an Epic Drama in Urdu has been written by Tahir under the title 'Sael e Rawan'. It is a researched narrative dramatized for stage. The subject is the rise and fall of the Muslim Empire and later freedom struggle in Indo Pakistan Sub-Continent. The narrative covers a period from 1609 to August 1947. The play has been repeatedly staged and is published along with other outstanding works as "Land Mark Theatre' by National Council of the Arts Islamabad.

Naeem Tahir has several other works telecast/ broadcast by Pakistan's networks. His research based work on terrorism was serialized recently as 'Samjhota Express'. Some of the subjects of his recent research include the roots, history and extent of terrorism in Pakistan and India. During his stay in USA in 2000 he was the COO of ICTV, a satellite channel in Urdu and English from Irvine California.

He has written two scripts for future film production namely 'Bombay by Boat' and 'God is Mine'.
Mr. Naeem Tahir holds degrees of BSc and MA (Psychology) from Punjab University, and a bachelor's degree in Theatre Arts from the University of California at Los Angeles. As a scholar he continues to update his knowledge. He taught theatre subjects in 60's at the Arts Council Lahore. Later he was appointed Principal Central Television Institute Islamabad where he trained all entrants at the newly established TV networks in Pakistan including Bangladesh (now). He was responsible for developing the curriculum's in consultation with a German and Pakistani faculty. He taught 'Analysis and interpretation' of scripts.
He is a visiting lecturer to the highest training centre for senior civil servants in Lahore named until recently as Civil Service Academ].

Tahir has held high positions in the Pakistan Government. His last appointment was as Chief Executive, Pakistan National Council of Arts, Ministry of Culture. He successfully completed and commissioned the National Art Gallery, popularly called, the 'Jewel of Islamabad' and taken note of by the international media. The National Art Gallery project was entirely developed during his tenure during his supervision. The National art Gallery complex is spread over 143000 Sq. Meters construction and houses 14 exhibition galleries, a modern theatre hall and studios. During his tenure he developed a program of Cultural Understanding through Performing Arts with The Kennedy Arts Centre at Washington. It was a three-year program which was partly implemented during his tenure.

Earlier, in his tenure at the Arts Council in Lahore he completed the construction and commissioning of the 'Alhamra Arts Centre' which includes two theatre halls and several art exhibition galleries, music centre and seminar halls. These are some of Mr. Tahir's tangible and durable contributions which shall be remembered for times to come.

In 2005 he was designated to represent Pakistan as the head of delegation in the Asia Culture Ministers Conference in Beijing. He has earlier been head of several cultural, goodwill and trade delegations to Europe, and South Asian Countries. Presently, he is Chairman  of the Unesco Theatre Institute Pakistan.

Filmography
Khuda Kay Liye (2007)

Television
 Muhabat Subh Ka Sitara Hai (2013)
 Mann Mayal (2016)
 Sangsaar (2017)
 Jannat (2017)

Published works
 Jalsa Urdu Dramay Ka (Urdu) 
Samjhota Express (Urdu) 
Melluhas of the Indus Valley (English) 
The Landmark Theatre (Urdu)
Views and Comments, 2 Volumes (English)
App Kee Tareef (Urdu)] 
Seilay Rowan (Urdu)
 Sayyidah Muhammadi Begum awr Unka Khandan, a biography of his grandmother, Muhammadi Begum.

References

External links

Living people
Pakistani dramatists and playwrights
1937 births
Pakistani male television actors
Pakistani male stage actors
Male actors from Lahore